The Erie Blizzard were a proposed independent junior ice hockey team in both the Continental Junior Hockey League (CJHL) and Midwest Junior Hockey League (MWJHL). The team was announced to play out of Ice Center of Erie in Erie, Pennsylvania, but never played a game.

History
The franchise was formed in 2010 as a charter member of the Continental Junior Hockey League for the 2010–11 season. The Blizzard's first head coach was announced as Curtis Prue. Prue had coached at Fairview High School where he won a league championship in 2008. He had also coached at Gannon University. However, prior to the 2010–11 season, the Blizzard had been unable to sign enough players to field a team and merged with the Niagara Fury for the season. In 2011, the Blizzard and Fury were announced to as fielding their own teams for the 2011–12 season. By October 2011, the CJHL was down to just two teams, the Blizzard and Fury. In November, the Blizzard announced they had withdrawn from the league.

The Blizzard briefly returned for the 2012–13 season when the team was announced as one of the founding members of the Midwest Junior Hockey League in the National Conference, Eastern Division. Only a few months into preparations for the season, the Erie Blizzard and a number of other teams went dark.

See also
Erie Otters

References

External links 
Official site

Amateur ice hockey teams in Pennsylvania
Sports in Erie, Pennsylvania
Ice hockey clubs established in 2010
Ice hockey clubs disestablished in 2012
2010 establishments in Pennsylvania
2012 disestablishments in Pennsylvania